The Royal Australian Air Force operates a number of specialised aircraft to transport the King of Australia and other members of the Royal Family, the Governor General of Australia, the Prime Minister of Australia, senior members of the Australian government and other dignitaries.

The RAAF's current Special Purpose Aircraft are two leased Boeing Business Jets and three Dassault Falcon 7x which are operated by No. 34 Squadron RAAF and are based at Canberra Airport. The Boeing Business Jets are custom configured Boeing 737-700s fitted with facilities such as conference tables, offices suites, secure satellite and communication capabilities. The two planes have a longer range than is standard for Boeing Business Jets. The Prime Minister regularly makes use of the aircraft for domestic and international travel.

Prior to the acquisition of the 737s, passenger-configured RAAF Boeing 707s tanker-transports were used. These aircraft were larger than the 737s currently in use.

In August 2014, the then Defence Minister David Johnston announced the intention to convert a KC-30A multi-role tanker to VIP configuration whilst maintaining its ability to serve as a military tanker and transport aircraft. The new plane has tail number A39-007. The new plane is painted in "air force grey" rather than the current colour scheme. The aircraft can now carry more than 100 passengers, including lower ministers and press on lie flat seats. The Prime Minister also has his own private section.

Current Fleet 

 Dassault Falcon 7X (3 aircraft, 2019–present) - replacement for Challenger 604s
737 Boeing Business Jet (2 aircraft, 2002–present)
Airbus KC-30A (1 aircraft, 2019–present) - New long range VIP Capacity

History
Prior to 1940, there were no dedicated aircraft available for use by federal government ministers. Canberra had become Australia's national capital in 1927, following the relocation of federal parliament from the temporary capital Melbourne, but many government agencies had not yet relocated. This necessitated frequent travel between the two cities for government ministers and their staff. In 1936, Australian National Airways began operating regular commercial air services using D.H.86s. Many members of parliament continued to prefer railway travel, but Prime Minister Joseph Lyons was a regular aircraft passenger and regarded the introduction of dedicated aircraft for cabinet ministers as inevitable. In August 1939, by which time Lyons had died in office and been succeeded by Robert Menzies, a cabinet submission by defence minister Geoffrey Street identified that "special flying arrangements might be necessary for urgent movements which do not fit in with the timetable of the air services". World War II broke out the following month and a War Cabinet was formed, meeting several times a week. As a result, in early 1940 air minister James Fairbairn approved the conversion of four newly ordered Lockheed Hudson bombers into passenger aircraft suitable for ministerial use, to be operated by the Royal Australian Air Force (RAAF).

The "VIP affair" of 1967 arose from the decision by the government and public service to maintain a veil of secrecy over the VIP flights program, attempting to conceal costs, destinations and passengers in order to prevent negative media coverage. This culminated in Prime Minister Harold Holt and Air Minister Peter Howson being found to have misled parliament over the existence of passenger manifests.

Airbus KC-30A (A39-007) VIP Transport 

For long haul flights, the KC-30A Multi-Role Tanker Transport aircraft registered A39-007 will fly with up to:
Three Pilots
Two Air Refuelling Operators
Eight Crew Attendants
One Network Technician (Formerly Communications and Information Systems Controller)
One Catering Representative
Five Maintenance consisting of Avionics Technicians and Aircraft Technicians, which can be reduced to four if technicians are cross-trained across both trades.

The KC-30A Multi-Role Tanker aircraft incorporates modifications to enable long-range Government transport, including enhanced in-air communications capability to support secure telecommunications. The modifications will enable the business of Government to continue while in the air, with access to unclassified and classified information technology environments and telecommunications. 
The VIP cabin interior is configured as follows:
VIP accommodation area including two first class seats and seat enclosures
A large meeting room which includes ten taxi, take-off and landing rated seats and a large conference room table
A working area with club style tables, video-telecommunications equipment and twelve taxi, take-off and landing rated seats
Bathroom facilities

The cabin configuration includes a total of 102 seats, comprising:
Seating area with 54 standard economy class seats
Seating area with 24 business class seats (lie-down seats)
A First Class lie-flat seating area for two people
Secure conference room with ten reclining seats at a table (and five periphery seats which are not certified for take-off or landing)
Working area with 12 lie-flat seats and tables

List of Former RAAF VIP transport aircraft

Lockheed Hudson (4 aircraft, 1940–?)
Douglas DC-3 Dakota (? VIP aircraft, 1943?-?)
Consolidated Liberator (? VIP aircraft, 1944?–1948?)
Avro York (1 aircraft, 1945–1947)
Convair Metropolitan (2 aircraft, 1957–1968)
Vickers Viscount (2 aircraft, 1964–1969)
Dassault Mystere 20C (3 aircraft, 1967–1989)
Hawker Siddeley HS748 (2 VIP aircraft, 1967–?)
BAC One-Eleven (2 aircraft, 1968–1989)
Boeing 707 (4 aircraft, 1979–2008) – reconverted to tanker transport
Dassault Falcon 900 (5 aircraft, 1989–2002)
Challenger 604 (3 aircraft, 2002–2019)

See also

 Air transports of heads of state and government
 1940 Canberra air disaster
 Garuda Indonesia Flight 200
 VIP aircraft affair
 Transportation of the Prime Minister of Australia
 Royal visits to Australia

References

Further reading

External links 
 RAAF Air Lift Group
 34 SQN Its Special Purpose – RAAF News
 RAAF Serial Numbers 1961–present – ADF Serials
 PM's delay highlights RAAF needs – AM, Australian Broadcasting Corporation
 Special Purpose Aircraft Business Unit (SPA BU) – QANTAS Defence Services
  - Regarding the RAAF airbus registration A39-007

Aircraft in Royal Australian Air Force service
Australia
Prime Minister of Australia
Governors-General of Australia
Monarchy in Australia
Royal vehicles
Government of Australia
Transport in Australia